The following is a list of notable deaths in September 1997.

Entries for each day are listed alphabetically by surname. A typical entry lists information in the following sequence:
 Name, age, country of citizenship at birth, subsequent country of citizenship (if applicable), reason for notability, cause of death (if known), and reference.

September 1997

1
Boris Balinsky, 91, Ukrainian and South African biologist, embryologist and entomologist.
Gordon Blake, 87, U.S. Air Force lieutenant general.
Harriet Browne, 65, American tap dancer and choreographer.
Zoltán Czibor, 68, Hungarian Olympic football player (1952 gold medal).
Joseph Abel Francis, 73, American Catholic bishop.
Reidar Olsen, 86, Norwegian footballer.

2
George E. Allen, 85, American football player and coach.
Rudolf Bing, 95, Austrian-born opera manager, Alzheimer's disease.
Viktor Frankl, 92, Austrian neurologist and psychiatrist.
Warner T. Koiter, 83, Dutch mechanical engineer and professor.
Joseph Thomas O'Keefe, 78, American prelate of the Roman Catholic Church, heart failure.
Germán Rieckehoff, 82, Puerto Rican politician.
Mary Sears, 92, American oceanographer.

3
Arthur Chin, 83, American pilot and World War II flying ace.
Harold G. Dick, 90, American mechanical engineer.
Hal Goodman, 82, American producer and screenwriter.
Hans Niclaus, 83, German basketball player.
Ernst C. Stiefel, 89, German-American jurist.

4
Khaled Abdul-Wahab, 86, Tunisian rescuer of Jews.
Chuck Arnold, 71, American racecar driver.
Jeffrey Bernard, 65, British journalist, renal failure.
Dharamvir Bharati, 70, Indian poet, author and playwright, heart disease.
Pierre Chatenet, 80, French politician.
Natko Devčić, 83, Croatian composer.
Hans Eysenck, 81, German-born British psychologist, brain cancer.
Alfred Kałuziński, 44, Polish handball player and Olympian.
Ivan Nenov, 95, Bulgarian painter.
Jan Opperman, 58, American racecar driver.
Florence Engel Randall, 79, American author.
Aldo Rossi, 66, Italian architect and designer, car accident.
Belle Stewart, 91, Scottish traditional singer.

5
Mildred Dein, 85, American screenwriter.
Ann Dunnigan, 87, American actress and teacher.
Leon Edel, 89, American literary critic and biographer.
Polly Lada-Mocarski, 94, American rare book scholar, educator, and bookbinder.
Manuel Martin, 79, American soccer player-coach.
Andrej Prean Nagy, 76, Romanian-Hungarian football player and coach.
Eddie Little Sky, 71, Native American actor, lung cancer.
Georg Solti, 84, Hungarian conductor, heart attack.
Mother Teresa, 87, Albanian missionary and humanitarian, recipient of the Nobel Peace Prize, heart failure.

6
Salvador Artigas, 84, Spanish football player and manager.
Edward H. Hurst, 80, United States Marine Corps officer.
Roy Huskey, Jr., 40, American upright bass player, lung cancer.
P. H. Newby, 79, English novelist.
H. W. L. Poonja, Indian sage and jivanmukta, pneumonia.
Refik Resmja, 66, Albanian footballer.
Jean-Pierre Sudre, 75, French photographer.
Uglješa Uzelac, 59, Bosnian politician and diplomat.

7
Abdullah al-Tariki, 78, Saudi politician and government official, heart attack.
Mukul S. Anand, 45, Indian film director and producer, heart attack.
Edwin Brock, 69, British poet.
Elisabeth Brooks, 46, Canadian actress (The Howling), brain cancer.
Connie Clausen, 74, American actress, author, and literary agent, stroke.
George W. Crockett, Jr., 88, African-American attorney, jurist, and congressman.
Héctor Espino, 58, Mexican baseball player and manager.
Mark Holtz, 51, American sportscaster, leukemia.
Edgar Kaplan, 72, American bridge player, cancer.
Mobutu Sese Seko, 66, Congolese politician and president of Zaire, prostate cancer.
Bill Strannigan, 78, American basketball coach.
Brian Whittaker, 40, Scottish football player.

8
Marie Bedford, 90, South African freestyle swimmer.
René Bihel, 81, French football player.
Yu Jim-yuen, 92, China opera singer and actor, heart attack.
Sabatino Moscati, 74, Italian archaeologist and linguist.
Helen Shaw, 100, American actress.
Vladimír Sommer, 76, Czech composer.
Derek Taylor, 65, English journalist, writer and record producer, throat cancer.

9
Richie Ashburn, 70, American baseball player (Philadelphia Phillies) and member of the MLB Hall of Fame, heart attack.
Rowland George, 92, British rower.
John Hackett, 86, Australian-born British army general and painter.
Predrag Laković, 68, Yugoslavian/Serbian actor.
Burgess Meredith, 89, American actor (Rocky, Batman, The Day of the Locust), Emmy winner (1977), melanoma.

10
Satish Chandra Agarwal, Indian politician.
Abraham Akaka, 80, American clergyman.
Richard Brandt, 86, American philosopher.
Jacques Leguerney, 90, French composer.
George Schaefer, 76, American television and theatre director.
Fritz Von Erich, 68, American professional wrestler, cancer.

11
Fernando Ayala, 77, Argentine film director, screenwriter and producer.
Camille Henry, 64, Canadian ice hockey player.
Iliya Kirchev, 64, Bulgarian football player.
Matrika Prasad Koirala, 85, Prime Minister of Nepal.
Hugo B. Margáin, 84, Mexican economist, politician and diplomat.
Anatoli Polosin, 62, Russian football coach.
Margaret Scrivener, 75, Canadian politician
Xhevdet Shaqiri, 74, Albanian football player and coach.
Hannah Weiner, 68, American poet.

12
Stig Anderson, 66, Swedish music manager and publisher, heart attack.
Leslie E. Brown, 77, United States Marine Corps aviator.
Elsa De Giorgi, 82, Italian actress and writer.
Leonard Maguire, 73, Scottish actor.
Judith Merril, 74, American-Canadian science fiction writer.
Eddie O'Toole, 76, American long-distance runner, heart attack.
Heorhiy Zhylin, 72, Ukrainian rower and Olympian.

13
Anjaan, 67, Indian lyricist.
Paul Brechler, 86, American athletic director (University of Iowa).
Roger O. Egeberg, 94, American medical educator and administrator.
Roger Frey, 84, French politician.
Georges Guétary, 82, French singer, dancer and actor, heart attack.
Kauko Helovirta, 72, Finnish film actor.
Giorgos Mitsibonas, 34, Greek football player, traffic collision.
Margo Rose, 94, American puppeteer.
Donald Schön, 66, American philosopher and professor in urban planning.
Victor Szebehely, 76, Hungarian-American physicist.
Myra Tanner Weiss, 80, American trotskyist politician.

14
Basri Dirimlili, 68, Turkish football player.
Andrew Fountaine, 78, British far right activist.
C. Warren Hollister, 66, American author and historian.
Clyde Johnson, 80, American football player.
Donato Piazza, 67, Italian racing cyclist.

15
Aleksanteri Ahola-Valo, 97, Finnish artist and architect.
Angel Balevski, 87, Bulgarian inventor and engineer.
Bulldog Brower, 63, American professional wrestler, complications from hip surgery.
Edna Mae Harris, 82, American actress and singer, heart attack.
Thomas J. Parmley, 99, American physicist.
Hubert Petschnigg, 83, Austrian architect.
Gertrude Pitzinger, 93, German contralto.

16
Terence Cooper, 64, British film actor.
James Milton Ham, 76, Canadian engineer and university official.
Helen Jepson, 92, American lyric soprano.
William N. Oatis, 83, American journalist, Alzheimer's disease.
Gerry Turpin, 72, English cinematographer.
José Valle, 77, Argentine football player and coach.

17
Benjamin Atkins, 29, American serial killer and rapist, AIDS-related complications.
Anthony Franchini, 99, American guitarist.
Nelson G. Gross, 65, American politician, murdered.
Brian Hall, 59, English actor (Fawlty Towers), cancer.
Harry Jago, 84, Australian politician.
Meena, 56, Indian actress.
Trevor Redmond, 70, New Zealand speedway rider.
Red Skelton, 84, American comedian (The Red Skelton Show), pneumonia.
Jan P. Syse, 66, Prime Minister of Norway (1989–1990), cerebral hemorrhage.

18
Fernand Fayolle, 93, French racing cyclist.
Patricia Pulling, 49, American anti-role-playing games activist, lung cancer.
Walpola Rahula, 90, Sri Lankan Buddhist monk, scholar and writer.
Yehuda Sha'ari, 77, Israeli politician.
Ganesh Man Singh, 81, Nepali politician.
Seigo Tada, 75, Japanese founder of Goju-Ryu Seigokan Karatedo.
Jimmy Witherspoon, 77, American blues singer, cancer.

19
Józef Bielawski, 87, Polish Arabist and scholar of Islam.
Bill Butland, 79, American baseball pitcher (Boston Red Sox).
Moses ǁGaroëb, 55, Namibian politician and founding member of SWAPO.
Kathy Keeton, 58, American editor and publisher of Penthouse magazine, complications from surgery.
Jack May, 75, English actor.
Rich Mullins, 41, American Christian musician, car accident.
Ambar Roy, 52, Indian cricket player.

20
Matt Christopher, 80, American children's author.
Virginia d'Albert-Lake, 87, American French Resistance agent during World War II.
Kurt Gloor, 54, Swiss film director, screenwriter and producer, suicide.
Anoop Kumar, 71, Indian film actor.
Nick Traina, 19, American punk band singer, suicide.

21
Juan Burgueño, 74, Uruguayan football player.
Teuku Muhammad Hasan, 91, Indonesian politician.
Jennifer Holt, 76, American actress, cancer.
Maurice Kaufmann, 70, British actor, cancer.

22
Beatrice Aitchison, 89, American mathematician, statistician, and economist.
Deolindo Bittel, 75, Argentine politician.
William Craig, 68, American author and historian.
Robert E. Huyser, 73, United States Air Force general.
Karl Koopman, 77, American zoologist.
Manabu Mabe, 73, Japanese-Brazilian painter, diabetes.
Pierre Petit, 77, French cinematographer.
Ruth Picardie, 33, English journalist and editor, breast cancer.
Eddie Sawyer, 87, American Major League Baseball scout.
George Thomas, 1st Viscount Tonypandy, 88, British politician.
Chiang Wei-kuo, 80, Secretary-General of the National Security Council of the Republic of China (1986–1993), diabetes.
Shoichi Yokoi, 82, Japanese soldier, heart attack.

23
Darko Bratina, 55, Italian sociologist, film theorist and politician, heart attack.
Dolf Brouwers, 85, Dutch comedian, singer, and television actor.
Shirley Clarke, 77, American filmmaker, stroke.
Dick Flanagan, 69, American gridiron football player.
Abe Gibron, 72, American gridiron football player and coach.
Cary Lu, 51, American science writer, cancer.
Doug Million, 21, American baseball player, asthma.
Jonas Pipynė, 61, Lithuanian track and field runner, skier, and Olympian.
Ray Poage, 56, American gridiron football player.
Lu Sheng, 85, Chinese military officer.
J.D. Thottan, 75, Indian director of Malayalam language films.
Pedro de Castro van Dúnem, 55, Angolan politician.
Torgny Wickman, 86, Swedish screenwriter and film director.

24
Anton Kehle, 49, German ice hockey goaltender, cancer.
William M. Miley, 99, United States Army officer and a professor.
Alby Morrison, 88, Australian rules football player and coach.
Yen Shui-long, 94, Taiwanese painter and sculptor, surgical complications after fall.
Jai Pal Singh, 67, Indian physician and educator.
Engalaguppe Seetharamiah Venkataramiah, 72, Chief Justice of India.
Remy Wagner, 75, Luxembourgian football player.
Ernest Will, 84, French archaeologist and professor.

25
John Ahern, 86, Irish Roman Catholic bishop.
Hélène Baillargeon, 81, Canadian singer, actor and folklorist.
Paul Bernard, 68, English television director and production designer.
Guillermo Díaz, 66, Chilean football player.
Jean Françaix, 85, French musician and composer.
Juan José Gámez, 58, Costa Rican football player and manager, cardiac arrest.
Jim Kemmy, 61, Irish politician.
Viktor Lipsnis, 63, Soviet shot putter and Olympian.
George MacDonald, 90, Canadian rower and Olympian.
Egon Seefehlner, 85, Austrian lawyer and opera director.
Komil Yashin, 87, Soviet and Uzbekistani poet and screenwriter.

26
Nick Carter, 95, American track and field athlete, coach and official.
Woody English, 91, American baseball player.
Richard Geoffrey Gerard, 92, New Zealand politician and cabinet minister.
Dorothy Kingsley, 87, American screenwriter (Angels in the Outfield, Valley of the Dolls, Seven Brides for Seven Brothers), heart failure.
Egon Scheibe, 88, German aviation engineer.
John Schubeck, 61, American television reporter and anchor, kidney and liver failure.
Samuel W. Taylor, 90, American novelist, scriptwriter, and historian.
Péter Zsoldos, 67, Hungarian science fiction author.

27
Alex Konikowski, 69, American baseball player.
Allan MacRae, 95, American Christian theologian.
Margot Mahler, 52, German actress.
Adriana Marines, 5, American  girl of Mexican descent, murdered.
Jacques Mercanton, 87, French cinematographer.
Mandali Venkata Krishna Rao, 71, Indian politician.
Walter Trampler, 82, American violist.

28
Munir Bashir, 66-67, Iraqi musician, stroke.
Frank D'Agostino, 63, American gridiron football player.
David Gill, 69, British film historian, preservationist and documentarian, heart attack.
Feng-Shan Ho, 96, Chinese diplomat.
Günther Maul, 88, German ichthyologist and taxidermist.
Lage Thunberg, 92, Swedish Air Force officer.
Elfriede Vey, 75, German cyclist.

29
William Goddard, 84, American engineer and inventor.
Roy Lichtenstein, 73, American pop artist, pneumonia.
Edith Ballinger Price, 100, American children's author and illustrator.
Fritz Schär, 71, Swiss cyclist.
Volodymyr Sterniuk, 90, Ukrainian Greek Catholic archbishop and the acting head of the UGCC (1972–91).
Aaron D. Wyner, 58, American information theorist.

30
Al "Jazzbo" Collins, 78, American disc jockey and musician, pancreatic cancer.
Nobuo Fujita, Japanese pilot and warrant officer during World War II.
Pierre Granche, 49, French-Canadian sculptor, lung cancer.
Edward L. Kessel, 93, American biologist.
Graeme MacDonald, 67, British television producer and executive.
Don Martin, 77, American basketball player.
Ernst van Heerden, 81, South African poet.

References 

1997-09
 09